The 1936 Lehigh Engineers football team was an American football team that represented Lehigh University during the 1936 college football season. In its second season under head coach Glen Harmeson, the team compiled a 6–2 record, and swept its Middle Three Conference rivals to earn the championship. 

The team played its home games at Taylor Stadium in Bethlehem, Pennsylvania.

Schedule

References

Lehigh
Lehigh Mountain Hawks football seasons
Lehigh Engineers football